Damaged Good is the tenth studio album by Dutch indie rock band Bettie Serveert, released in 2016 on Palomine Records. The CD was released on October 28, 2016, and the LP was released on November 4 of that year.

Track listing
"B-Cuz" – 2:56
"Brickwall" – 1:09
"Brother (in Loins)" – 3:56
"Damaged Good" – 3:06
"Whatever Happens" – 4:42
"Unsane" – 3:09
"Digital Sin (Nr 7)" – 7:47
"Mouth of Age" – 0:44
"Love Sick" (feat. Peter te Bos) – 2:46
"Mrs. K" – 3:32
"Never Be Over" (feat. Prof. Nomad & Co) – 3:55

Personnel
Carol Van Dyk – vocals, guitar
Peter Visser – guitar
Herman Bunskoeke – bass guitar
Joppe Molenaar – drums
Jesse Beuker – keys on Brother (in Loins), Whatever Happens, Unsane, Love Sick
Peter te Bos – vocals on Love Sick

References

Bettie Serveert albums
2016 albums